is a racing and drifting driver from Tottori Prefecture, Japan. Miki was the  D1 Grand Prix champion driving the Top Secret Silvia S15. Miki also competed in the Net'z Cup, a one make series for the Toyota Altezza between 2005 and its final season in 2006 and is nicknamed Doki-Doki kun due to his drifting style.

Ryuji Miki started in the series in his own S14 Silvia, before switching to the Top Secret modified S15 for the  season. During the  season, partway through the season when Nobuteru Taniguchi switched to the Toyota Altezza, leading to a sudden change of fortune, as many felt that Miki was fortunate as he also managed to get score his sole win at Odaiba, allowing Miki to finish the season with the title that year, beating Taniguchi by 28pts, currently the widest margin of the series.

For the  season, following the opening Irwindale round, Miki switched to a Top Secret modified Fairlady Z Z33 powered by a RB26. He was unable to follow on his successes of the previous season as he only managed to scrape 16 pts. Much of it was, at the time, the Z33 was still in development to be fully competitive in drifting, due to its weight, one of its reason why it befell many of its drivers.

His last win was at the Silverstone exhibition event in his old S15, that year was to be his last season in the series. For the  season, rival Youichi Imamura's team and title sponsor, A'PEXi withdrew from the series due to a redirection in the company's business strategies, leading him to take over Miki's Z33. As of 2007, incidentally, Miki would compete in Formula D driving with Imamura's previous D1 sponsor, APEX'i (partnering with Bergenholtz Racing) and driving a white FD3S.

Throughout the 2007 season, in light of issues he faced with adapting to driving a left hand drive car for the first time, not to mention within a full season of racing, Ryuji managed to finish the Formula D season impressively.  Reaching the rank of top 16 within 4 events, Ryuji finally adapted to the car within the 6th and 7th rounds finishing 14th overall for the season. Continuing on in 2008 with major backing by Bergenholtz Racing, Nitto Tires, and MAZDA, Ryuji Miki will continue to pilot the APEX RX-7 with plans to potentially unveil a new car for 2009.  According to Keith Covey and Chuck Griffice of APEX Integration's R&D department, the new setup on the 2008 car has been completely redone and Ryuji will be adapting to what essentially amounts to a new car.

Complete drifting results

D1 Grand Prix

Formula D

Notes

External links
Official site
Yahoo! Blog
D1 Supporter profile
Formula D profile

Japanese racing drivers
Drifting drivers
1975 births
Living people
D1 Grand Prix drivers
Formula D drivers